Johnson Family Vacation is a 2004 American road comedy film directed by Christopher Erskin. It stars Cedric the Entertainer, Vanessa Williams, Bow Wow, Gabby Soleil, Shannon Elizabeth, Solange Knowles, and Steve Harvey. The story revolves around the Johnson family going on a road trip to attend a family reunion in Missouri and the numerous hijinks they occur along the way. The film is director Erskin's first and only feature film directorial project to date. It also marks the feature film debut of Jason Momoa. A sequel, titled Johnson Family Celebration, is in development.

Plot

Nate Johnson, and his son, DJ, arrive at an auto body shop in Los Angeles to pick up his Lincoln Navigator, and much to Nate's chagrin, there has been a mix up, and his truck has gone from needing a simple 8-track to being pimped out with hydraulics and spinning rims. He is told that it will take 3 days to remove all the bells and whistles off of his truck. However, Nate has to take his truck as is because he and his family are due in Missouri for a family reunion.

Once Nate and DJ arrive home, Nate gets a phone call from his mother, Glorietta, who disapproves of his marriage to his wife, Dorothy, and the phone call is taken over by Nate's older brother, Mack, who always tries to one up Nate by appealing to their mother's material needs. When it is time for Nate and DJ to leave, it is revealed that Nate is separated from his wife, Dorothy, and she lives in a different house down the street, as well as their two daughters, Nikki and Destiny. Nate also has an estranged relationship with their daughter.

While Nate and DJ wait for the girls to come out, Nikki is locked in her room chatting on her cellphone, while her little sister, Destiny is trying to get in so she can get her stuff for her invisible dog, Sir Barks-a Lot. Nikki and Dorothy disagree about Nikki's cell phone usage and outfit choices, and Dorothy goes outside to meet Nate and DJ. When Nate sees that Dorothy is bringing her schoolwork on the road trip with her, his disapproval of Dorothy's studying is shown. Destiny's birthday is the day after they leave, and after Nate tells Destiny what he will do for her birthday, a man named Stan Turner shows up calling for Dorothy. He pulls up in a drop top car playing classical music, and he tells Dorothy that he reserved a table for them and brought her freshly picked flowers. Nate steps in, explains that he is Dorothy's husband, and threatens and scares Stan off. The family gets in the car, and they start off on their road trip. Nate reaches an Indian casino, where he thought it was an Indian reservation and also teach her daughter Nikki about the Indians. Nikki flirts with the Indian tour guide, which Nate doesn't like. Nate embarrasses her and she tells him off. As a consequence, Nate punishes her and takes away her cell phone.

The road trip seems to be going smoothly until they reach a long stretch of highway where a semi truck is trying to run them off the road. The truck slams into the back of the family's SUV and all of their suitcases tumble out. Nate is able to spin his vehicle out of the truck's way, and everyone, including Nate, is visibly shaken up. Night time comes, and they stop at a hotel, where Dorothy pretends she is interested in rekindling her and Nate's estranged romance, but really she just wanted to get out of the truck and relax.

Once they leave the hotel and resume their trip, they run into a hitchhiker, Chrishelle, and when Dorothy shakes her head at Nate, he quotes to her “what would Jesus do” to justify him stopping for the attractive young woman. When Chrishelle gets into the truck, she steals cereal from Destiny, and drops a reefer pipe in the back seat. The family stops at Bun World for lunch, and Destiny's birthday celebration, and when Nate asks Chrishelle to bless the food, she begins to roll her eyes and hiss strange phrases, which frightens the family.  They all refuse to sit near her once they get back in the car. That evening, they all go to a hotel to rest, and Nate is woken up by a small alligator in his and Dorothy's bed. As he and DJ fight the alligator, Chrishelle comes in, and it is revealed that the alligator, named Twinkie, is hers. They quickly ditch Chrishelle and get back on the road.

While in the car, all the girls are sleeping, and DJ begs his father to pull over because he has to relieve himself due to drinking so many sodas. He eventually relieves himself in a to-go soda cup, and when Nate gets thirsty, he goes for the cup, but smells it, tosses it out of the window, and accidentally hitting a cop on a motorcycle. When DJ alerts Nate to what he's done, Nate turns around, not paying attention to the road, and accidentally drives through a construction site, hitting a cement truck, causing wet cement to pour all over the grill and hood of his SUV. The cop arrests all of them, due to Nate littering, and because the cop finds one of Chrishelle's missing reefer pipes in the back seat. While they are locked up, Dorothy assists the officer in writing off his taxes, and in exchange for Dorothy's help, the officer lets the family go.

Back on the road, Nate runs out of gas, and he goes to find a phone to call his Uncle Earl. Earl eventually shows up, and after he flirts with Dorothy, he starts working on the SUV, using hair straighteners and other inappropriate tools to fix the problem, although Dorothy tells him they just need gas. Earl hauls the truck onto the back of his, and he carries the family the rest of the way to the family reunion. Once they show up to the reunion, Nate greets his brother, then his mother, who openly criticizes his and Dorothy's marriage, and after reconsidering telling Gloriana the truth about their marriage, Dorothy tells her she and Nate will renew their wedding vows and passionately kisses Nate in front of his mother. Mack and Nate gather with their relatives to pray for the food, but it turns into a competition, and their relatives walk away and begin eating without them. As the day goes on, the two families compete for the “Family of the Year” trophy, which Mack has never lost, and the ultimate showdown comes from the families doing separate musical performances on stage. Nate and his family go around stealing items from relatives for their on-stage outfits, and their performance, which includes groovy dance moves and slick rapping from DJ, wins them the trophy. Mack breaks down, and Nate gives him the trophy, saying that his family was the only trophy he needed. As the family celebrates, the same semi truck that ran Nate off the highway shows up, barreling through the park, tearing decorations down and almost hitting Nate's relatives. The driver turns out to be Stan, still stewing over the fact that Dorothy isn't as interested in him as he assumed, and he reveals in front of their whole family that Nate and Dorothy live in separate houses. Nate confesses that he hasn't been a very supportive husband, and after apologizing to Dorothy, Glorietta tells Nate it's about time Nate realized what a good wife he had. Stan still won't let up, and after Nate threatens to fight Stan, Glorietta says no, then turns around and punches Stan herself. Nate and his family leave, with Nate telling everyone that his wife has some studying to do.

Nate, Dorothy, and the kids show up at Uncle Earl's auto shop, and when Uncle Earl reveals their truck, it looks as good as new. Earl isn't a very professional mechanic, and he says he used fluoride toothpaste and a wire coat hanger to make sure Nate's truck was in good shape for driving. Nate and his family get into their truck, and once he and Dorothy share a reconciling kiss, they head home with no issues. They get to Dorothy's house, and when Nate hits the lock button on the car remote, the truck completely falls apart in the driveway. This gets Nate upset because Uncle Earl did not fix it right, but Dorothy tells him not to worry about it because they have other things to do, hinting that they are going to rekindle their romance. Nate smiles and runs into the house after Dorothy.

Cast
 Cedric the Entertainer as Nathaniel "Nate" Johnson/Uncle Earl Johnson
 Bow Wow as Divirnius James "D.J." Johnson
 Vanessa Williams as Dorothy Johnson
 Christopher B. Duncan as Stanley "Stan" Turner
 Solange Knowles as Nikki Johnson
 Shannon Elizabeth as Chrishelle Rene Boudreau
 Gabby Soleil as Destiny Johnson
 Steve Harvey as Mack Johnson
 Aloma Wright as Glorietta Johnson
 Godfrey as Motorcycle Cop
 Jason Momoa as Navarro
 Jennifer Freeman as Jill Johnson
 Jeremiah "J.J." Williams Jr. as Cousin Bodie Johnson
 Lee Garlington as Betty Sue
 Lorna Scott as Gladys
 Philip Daniel Bolden as Mack Johnson Jr.
 Rodney Perry as Cousin Lump Johnson
 Shari Headley as Jacqueline Johnson
 DeRay Davis as Jamaican Stoner
 Kurupt as Himself
 Tanjareen Martin as Tangerine
 Lichelli Lazar-Lea as Navi Computer (voice)

Reception
Johnson Family Vacation was heavily panned by critics. The critical consensus says: "The poorly crafted Johnson Family Vacation squanders its talented cast in a bland family road comedy that draws unfavorable comparisons to Chevy Chase's Vacation movies." The film has a 29 out of 100 rating on Metacritic based on 24 critics, indicating "generally unfavorable reviews". The critics gave it a "C−" rating at Yahoo! Movies.

Keith Phipps of The A.V. Club criticized the film for being "stitched together with regional stereotypes and gags lifted from other movies". The Austin Chronicles Marjorie Baumgarten found the humor "half-baked – all setups with few satisfactory payoffs" and the filmmakers' talents lacking in making new and creative comedy set pieces, concluding that "Johnson Family Vacation is as arduous to watch as your neighbor's poorly focused vacation slides." Roger Ebert felt that Cedric's talents were watered down by the film's "paint-by-numbers" script and Erskin's direction having "style without zing", calling it "a routine cross-country comedy that feels exactly like a series of adventures recycled out of every other cross-country comedy." Andy Patrizio of IGN commended Cedric's comedic chemistry alongside Harvey and Williams but felt he didn't work with Shannon's miscast role and the film overall getting bogged down by "a few cases of bathroom humor," concluding that, "[W]hile in the spirit of Vacation, it's not quite on its level. But that shouldn't stop anyone from checking it out on a slow night. I wouldn't make it a top priority rental, but don't dismiss it, either. "

Awards & nominations
 2004 BET Comedy Awards
 Outstanding Lead Actor in a Box Office Movie – Cedric the Entertainer (nominated)
 Outstanding Lead Actress in a Box Office Movie – Vanessa Williams (nominated)
 Outstanding Writing for a Box Office Movie (nominated)

Sequel
On October 18, 2019, The Hollywood Reporter announced that a sequel entitled Johnson Family Celebration is in production. Cedric the Entertainer will return to star and produce; DeVon Franklin will co-produce while Michael Elliot (Like Mike, Brown Sugar, Just Wright) will write the screenplay.

References

External links
 
 
 
 
 

2004 films
2004 comedy films
2004 directorial debut films
2000s American films
2000s comedy road movies
2000s English-language films
African-American comedy films
American comedy road movies
Columbia Pictures films
Films about vacationing
Films scored by Richard Gibbs
Films set in Missouri
Films set in Kansas
Films set in Los Angeles